Patrick Behan (1936 – 10 June 1992) was an Irish hurler. At club level he played with Ballyhea and Churchtown, divisional side Avondhu and at inter-county level was a member of the Cork senior hurling team. Behan usually lined out as a forward.

Career

Behan first played hurling at club level with Ballyhea and won several North Cork JHC titles with the club. His performances earned a call-up to the Avondhu team and he captained the divisional side to the Cork SHC title in 1966. Behan first played at inter-county level as a member of the Cork senior hurling team during the unsuccessful 1960 Munster SHC campaign. He was later drafted onto the Cork junior hurling team that lost the 1960 All-Ireland home final to Carlow. Behan also lined out with the Cork intermediate hurling team in the early rounds of the their successful 1964 Munster IHC campaign.

Death

Behan died after a long period of ill health on 10 June 1992, aged 55.

Honours

Avondhu
Cork Senior Hurling Championship: 1966 (c)

Cork
Munster Intermediate Hurling Championship: 1964

References

1936 births
1992 deaths
Ballyhea hurlers
Avondhu hurlers
Cork inter-county hurlers